Milwaukee has a humid continental climate (Köppen climate classification Dfa), with four distinct seasons and wide variations in temperature and precipitation in short periods of time. The city's climate is also strongly influenced by nearby Lake Michigan, which creates two varying climates within the Milwaukee area. The Urban heat island effect also plays a role in the city's climate, insulating it from winter cold, but keeping it cooler in spring and summer.

Monthly normals and record temperatures

Temperatures
Milwaukee has a continental climate with wide variations in temperatures over short periods, especially in spring and autumn. The warmest month is July, when the average high temperature is 81 °F (27 °C), and the overnight low is 63 °F (17 °C). The coldest month is January, when the average high temperature is only 28 °F (-2 °C). Low temperatures in January average 16°F (-8°C).

The highest temperature ever recorded in Milwaukee is 105 °F (41 °C) on July 24, 1935 and the coldest temperature is -26 °F (-32 °C), on both January 17, 1982 and February 4, 1996. The former occasion is referred to as "Cold Sunday", because of the extreme cold felt in many locations in the United States on that day.

Precipitation
Milwaukee has varied precipitation throughout the year, in both type and amount. Although rain can fall all year round, it is rare during winter months. Snow falls from late November until early March, although snow can fall as early as late September or as late as the end of May. During the transition into and out of winter, various mixed forms of precipitation can occur, such as sleet, ice, and freezing rain. Ice storms are uncommon. These types of precipitation tend to occur mainly in November and March.

An average year in Milwaukee sees 34.81 inches (884.2 mm) of precipitation, with a yearly average snowfall of 52.4 inches (133 cm). The city receives more snowfall than cities even slightly inland because of lake-effect snow produced by Lake Michigan. As Milwaukee lies on the western shore of Lake Michigan, east winds, although not the prevailing wind direction in the Midwest, occur when panhandle hook systems move northeast bringing heavier snowfall on the Milwaukee side of the lake. Milwaukee receives far less snow than cities on the eastern shore of the lake, which receive extra snowfall when more common west or north-west winds blow.

The wettest month of the year is August, with an average 4.03 inches (102 mm) of precipitation, mainly as rainfall. Long-duration rains are uncommon in summer, usually occurring only in April or October. Thunderstorms are the main precipitation events from May until September, and Milwaukee experiences an extended tornado season that lasts from late March until early June, however, severe weather and tornadoes are more frequent inland to the west. The driest month is February, when only 1.65 inches (41.9 mm) of precipitation falls, almost entirely as light, low moisture content snow resulting from the Alberta clipper type system when cold, dry air masses dominate.

Notes

See also
Geography of Wisconsin § Climate
Climate of Door County, Wisconsin
Green Bay, Wisconsin § Climate
Manitowoc, Wisconsin § Climate
Madison, Wisconsin § Climate
Climate of Chicago
Lake Michigan § Hydrology

References

Milwaukee
Milwaukee metropolitan area
Milwaukee
Climate of Wisconsin